Ramodatodes is a genus of beetles in the family Cerambycidae, containing the following species:

 Ramodatodes armicollis (Fairmaire, 1902)
 Ramodatodes elegans Villiers, 1982
 Ramodatodes nigripes Villiers, 1982
 Ramodatodes rufovelutinum (Fairmaire, 1902)
 Ramodatodes sericeum Villiers, 1982

References

Dorcasominae